The Pomodoro di Pachino (English: Tomato of Pachino) is an IGP/PGI for tomatoes from the southeast coast of Sicily, Italy, which has been granted IGP protection by the EU since 2003.

Varieties
The four varieties allowed within the classification include both cherry tomatoes and Costoluto tomatoes, and are:
 Ciliegino (cherry)
 Costoluto (large salad tomato; similar to a beefsteak tomato)
 Tondo liscio (round and smooth)
 Grappolo ('grape' tomato)

Area allowed for cultivation

Under the classification, the zone of production lies within the area bordered by Noto to the north, Portopalo di Capo Passero to the south, both in Syracuse, and Ispica (Ragusa) to the west.

References

External links 
  Pomodoro di Pachino - Official Site

Italian products with protected designation of origin
Italian cuisine
Cuisine of Sicily
Tomato cultivars
Province of Syracuse
Province of Ragusa